To date, the United States Medal of Honor has been awarded on 103 occasions for actions involving the use of aircraft. Awards for actions that took place in a single flight are the norm, with 74 individual aircraft accounting for 82 of the 93 medals awarded for actions while in flight (including eight dual awards representing the same aircraft). Of those 75 planes, 41 were destroyed during the MoH action, while others were lost later. In a few cases the MoH recipient survived while the plane did not (Jimmy Doolittle's North American B-25 Mitchell, as an example). The reverse also occurred: Lts. Jack W. Mathis and Robert E. Femoyer received posthumous awards while their respective Boeing B-17 Flying Fortresses survived, only to be scrapped later.

Some aircraft were recognized following their crew's award but were not preserved, including Butch O'Hare's Grumman F4F Wildcat, which wasn't stricken until two and one half years after his MoH action, as well as Maj. James H. Howard's "borrowed" North American P-51 Mustang, whose identity remains a mystery. In wartime often the pressing needs for serviceable aircraft overcame their need for preservation in programs or museums that did not yet exist.

World War II
By far the most MoH's were issued to crewmen flying on Boeing aircraft. Boeing B-17 Flying Fortress crewmen received 17 awards from 1942 to 1945. Eleven of the Flying Fortress MoH's were posthumous awards, while in 1945 a Boeing B-29 Superfortress crewman was awarded the MoH for saving his plane despite crippling burns. Eleven Consolidated aircraft were involved in MoH missions, including two Consolidated PBY Catalinas. The MoH awarded to Consolidated B-24 Liberator crewmen were largely associated with the series of attacks on the Romanian oil refineries in 1943–44 although one went to a Navy PB4Y Privateer. The Grumman F4F Wildcat represents the most MoH's for a fighter aircraft serving in World War II by a sizable margin, with 8 MoH recipients. Seven F4F MoH's were to Marine Corps pilots, six of whom received their MoH for missions in the Solomon Islands during 1942–43. The lone Navy pilot was Lt. (j.g.) Edward H. "Butch" O'Hare, recognized as the Navy's first World War II ace. Cmdr. David McCampbell's two MoH missions in 1944 were in a Grumman F6F Hellcat bring Grumman's tally to nine MoH aircraft.

Korean War
Korean War MoH aircraft include a wide range of types, from World War II vintage aircraft to jets. They include one each for the North American F-51 Mustang, Lockheed P-80 Shooting Star, North American F-86 Sabre, Douglas A-26 Invader, Vought F4U Corsair, and the first MoH helicopter, a Sikorsky HO3S.

Vietnam War
The Vietnam War produced 20 in-flight MoH awards. They include a very diverse group of 7 fixed-wing aircraft and four helicopters, which range from a Cessna O-1 Bird Dog Forward Air Controller to a Fairchild C-123 Provider transport, to a Republic F-105 Thunderchief fighter-bomber, plus the well-represented Bell Huey. The McDonnell-Douglas F-4 Phantom II is represented only by pilot Lance Sijan, who was awarded a posthumous MoH for his exceptional courage as a POW. Bernard F. Fisher earned an MoH in the A-1 Skyraider when he landed his aircraft under enemy fire to rescue a fellow pilot that had been shot down. Notable for its absence is the Grumman A-6 Intruder.

Survivors
Very few MoH aircraft survive today, especially since nearly half of all awards have been posthumous. Today four MoH combat aircraft still exist, plus two non-combat aircraft and the parts of one MoH Grumman F4F Wildcat.

Ryan NYP. Charles Lindbergh's custom Ryan aircraft is on display at the National Air and Space Museum in Washington, D.C.
Fokker Trimotor. Richard Evelyn Byrd and Floyd Bennett's Trimotor, the Josephine Ford, is on display at the Henry Ford Museum in Dearborn, Michigan.
Douglas A-1E Skyraider (s/n 52-132649) is on display at the National Museum of the United States Air Force in Dayton, Ohio. In 1967, one year after the action for which its pilot, Maj, Bernard Fisher, was awarded the MoH, the aircraft crashed on a training flight. Being well-used and in bad condition, it was sent back to the U.S. for scrapping. Fortunately its identity was recognized by a staff member at the scrapping site, and the aircraft was sent to the Museum for preservation. The aircraft is on display in the Museum's Modern Flight gallery.
Bell UH-1C Huey (s/n 66-00528) is owned 11th Armored Cavalry Regiment, and is on display at Fort Irwin, CA. This is the aircraft for which Sgt. Rodney Yano was awarded the MoH for his actions on 1 January 1969. On that date Sgt. Yano, serving as a volunteer crew chief aboard Maj. John Bahnsen's command helicopter of the 11th Cavalry Regiment, was dropping grenades from the aircraft to mark a target for fighter-bombers. A phosphorus grenade detonated prematurely and began to ignite the remaining ammunition on board. Despite the loss of his left hand, severe burns, and loss of sight, Sgt. Yano searched through the aircraft as the explosives detonated around him, throwing the ammunition overboard. His action saved the aircraft and its crew. Sgt. Yano, the son of a Hawaiian fisherman, died that night of his injuries.
Bell UH-1E Huey (BuNo. 154760) is on display at the National Museum of the Marine Corps in Triangle, Virginia. This is the aircraft for which Capt. Steve Pless was awarded the MoH for his actions in August 1967. His aircraft was diverted to the site of an Army helicopter that had been shot down behind enemy lines. Four GIs survived the crash and were pinned down by enemy fire. Capt. Pless fired his machine guns and rockets at the enemy forces then landed his helicopter between them and the trapped Americans. Three of the GIs were able to board the aircraft while his copilot and crew chief killed additional enemy troops, some less than 10 feet away. Capt. Pless got the overloaded aircraft airborne and returned safely to base. Two of the rescued soldiers died, but the survivor owed his life to Capt. Pless and his crew.
Boeing Vertol CH-46D Sea Knight (BuNo. 153389) is on display at the Carolinas Aviation Museum in Charlotte, North Carolina. It has been restored to the marking of its MoH mission, including the name Blood, Sweat & Tears. In addition to its MoH action, this remarkable aircraft is reported to have flown in every major Marine Corps operation since Vietnam, including Beirut, Grenada, Kuwait and Somalia.
Grumman F4F-3 Wildcat (BuNo. 4019) (parts). Capt. Henry T. Elrod was awarded a posthumous MoH in recognition for his heroism while flying this aircraft, known as Mike Fox 11, over Wake Island in December 1941. A postwar memorial on Wake featured the cowling nose ring and propeller of an F4F believed to be Capt. Elrod's aircraft. When the tribute was dismantled around 1965 the parts were sent to the Marine Corps Museum. When the National Air and Space Museum restored its FM-1 the only cowling nose ring that could be located was the one taken from the Wake Island memorial. Though it cannot be proven conclusively that the cowling nose ring is indeed from Mike Fox 11, leathernecks certainly like to believe that it is.

One near-survivor was Fairchild C-123 Provider (55-4542), the aircraft MoH recipient Maj. Joe Jackson was piloting when he made his daring rescue of Air Force personnel trapped on an airstrip being overrun by Communist forces in 1968. By the time the Air Force History Office learned the aircraft still existed it had been transferred to the South Vietnamese government, who later transferred it to the Thai government. The aircraft was apparently not scrapped until the early 1990s. Another was Republic F-105 Thunderchief (63-8301), which had been piloted by Leo Thorsness while he provided cover for a rescue mission for a downed pilot. Despite having been slated for display at the National Museum of the United States Air Force, it was lost to a crash in 1974 after pilot Paul Metz was forced to eject due to engine failure.

In-Flight Medal of Honor Awards: Aircraft

Medal of Honor Awards: Aviation-related actions (aircraft not in flight and aircraft of POW's)

References

Notes

Bibliography

External links
 Medal of Honor Recipients of the Vietnam War at the United States Army Center of Military History
 MOH Aviation Master List - Scribd

Medal of Honor